Ghost Toasties is an adventure published by West End Games in 1986 for the light-hearted role-playing game  Ghostbusters, itself based on the movie Ghostbusters.

Contents
Ghost Toasties is an adventure in which the deity Hagoth seeks a crystal containing his life-force that has been hidden in a packet of breakfast cereal. The player characters must enter Hagost's pocket universe, overcome guardians that resemble popular cartoon animals of the time before confronting Hagost.

Four pages of the 24-page booklet are player handouts. A 3-panel gamemaster's screen is also included.

Publication history
West End Games first published the Ghostbusters role-playing game under license in 1986, and immediately followed up with three adventures for the game, one of them being Ghost Toasties. The 24-page adventure was written by Scott Haring, with art by Russ Steffens.

Reception
Fiona Lloyd reviewed Ghost Toasties for White Dwarf #81, and stated that "Overall, the screen is nice, if not essential. Played for giggles, this is a good package."

Other reviews
Abyss Issue 39 (Autumn 1986, p. 8)

References

Ghostbusters (role-playing game)
Role-playing game adventures
Role-playing game supplements introduced in 1986